Association for Machines and Mechanism, India is the Indian national affiliate of the International Federation for the Promotion of Mechanism and Machine Science, IFToMM. The main objective of AMM is to contribute to mechanical design at all levels starting from academic projects to industrial production, thus enhancing the quality and the reliability of indigenous machines. AMM organizes the National Conference on Machines and Mechanisms (NaCoMM) and the workshop on Industrial Problems on Machines and Mechanisms (IPRoMM) regularly.

Conferences and Workshops 

1. National Conference on Machines and Mechanisms (NaCoMM): NaCoMM Conferences lay emphasis on theoretical aspects and experimental studies relating to machinery. The first NaCoMM Conference, NaCoMM 81 was held at IIT Bombay in 1981. NaCoMM covers a wide range of topics including kinematics and dynamics of machines, robotics and automation, CAD, automobile engineering, rotor dynamics and tribology, vibration of machines, condition monitoring and failure analysis, man-machine systems and mechatronices, micro-mechanisms and control systems. The upcoming NaCoMM conference will be held at NIT Durgapur, India on December 17–18, 2009.

2. Industrial Problems on Machines and Mechanisms (IPRoMM): IPRoMM essentially concentrates on industrial problems and practical solutions to the design of machines in specific areas. The workshops held so far have covered textile, mechanical handling agricultural machinery and home appliances. The latest IPRoMM covers precision instruments and micro–mechanisms. The first IPRoMM, IPRoMM 86, was held in December 1986 at ATIRA in Ahmedabad.

3. AMM Workshop on Design of Mechanisms for Solving Real Life Problems: The workshop aims at giving the participant an opportunity to discuss the design issues for a host of advanced concepts in rigid and compliant mechanisms with the recognized experts in the field and explore the possibilities of collaborative work. The upcoming AMM workshop on the design on mechanisms will be held at IIT Madras, India on October 23–25, 2008.

Other Activities 
One prominent activity of AMM is the organization of the best design project contest for students. The hosts of a Conference invite students to submit papers based on their B.E/M.E/B.Tech/M.Tech. projects and present awards to the best design projects. Two such contests have been conducted so far, one in Mumbai (NaCoMM 87) and one in Nagpur (IPRoMM 89).

List of AMM Calendar Activities

     NaCoMM 81, IIT Bombay, December 1981 
      6th IFToMM, IIT Delhi, December 1983, 
      NaCoMM 85, February 1985, IISc Bangalore 
      IPRoMM 86, December 1986, ATIRA, Ahmedabad 
      IPRoMM 87, December 1987, VJTI, Bombay 
      IPRoMM 89, January 1989, VRCE, Nagpur 
     NaCoMM 90, March 1990, IIT Roorkee 
      NaCoMM 91, December 1991, IIT Madras 
      IPRoMM 92, February 1992, PSG College of Technology, Coimbatore 
  NaCoMM 93, December 1993, IIT Kharagpur
  IPRoMM 95, February 1995, BMS College of Engineering, Bangalore 
  NaCoMM 96, January 1996, CMERI, Durgapur 
  NaCoMM 97, December  1997, IIT Kanpur
  NaCoMM 99, December 1999, IIT Bombay  
  NaCoMM 2001, December 2001, IIT Kharagpur 
  IPRoMM 2003, February 2003, VIT, Vellore          
  NaCoMM 2003, December  2003, IIT Delhi 
  DTDM 2004, December 2004, IIT Madras
  NaCoMM 2005, December  2005, IIT Guwahati 
  IPRoMM 2005, Feb 2005, IIT Kharagpur 
  PCEA IFToMM 2006, Recent Trends in Automation, Priyadarshini College of Engg & Architecture, Nagpur 
  Team Tech 2006, August 2006 Symp Micro & Nano Fabrication 
  IPRoMM 2007, Jan 2007, Kumaragur College of Tech 
  iCAMDIA 2007, Int Conf Adv in Machine Design & Ind Auto, College of Engg Pune
  NaCoMM 2007, IISc Bangalore.
 NaCoMM2009, NIT Durgapur.

References

External links 
 AMM India Website 
 IFToMM Website 
 NaCoMM 2007 Website 
 Announcement of AMM Workshop, 2008
 Schedule of AMM Workshop, 2008
 Announcement of NaCoMM, 2009

Academic conferences